The Baron is the 66th album by American country singer Johnny Cash, released on Columbia Records in 1981 (see 1981 in music). The title track was a top ten hit, and three singles in all — including "Mobile Bay" and "The Reverend Mr. Black"  / "Chattanooga City Limit Sign" — were released, though the latter two were rather unsuccessful in the charts, peaking at No. 60 and No. 71.

Cash recorded the album with famed countrypolitan producer Billy Sherrill. Other sessions with him would be released on the 2014 album Out Among the Stars.

Track listing

Personnel 
 Johnny Cash - vocals, guitar
 Pete Wade, Phil Baugh, Terry Jacks, Billy Sanford, Pete Bordonali - guitar
 Marty Stuart - guitar, fiddle, arrangements
 Pete Drake, Weldon Myrick - steel guitar
 Hargus "Pig" Robbins, Bobby Wood - piano
 Bobby Emmons - keyboards
 Terry McMillan, Charlie McCoy - harmonica
 Bob Wray - bass
 Jerry Carrigan, Kenny Malone, Jerry Kroon - drums
 Lea Jane Berinati, Millie Forrest, Janie Fricke, The Jordanaires, Millie Kirkham, Louis Nunely, Gordon Stocker, Hurshel Wiginton - background vocals
Bill McElhiney - string arrangements
Technical
Ron Reynolds - engineer
Bill Johnson - sleeve design
Slick Lawson - photography

Chart performance

Album

Singles

References

Johnny Cash albums
1981 albums
Columbia Records albums
Albums produced by Billy Sherrill